The 1884 United States presidential election in Missouri took place on November 4, 1884. All contemporary 38 states were part of the 1884 United States presidential election. Voters chose 16 electors to the Electoral College, which selected the president and vice president.

Missouri was won by Governor Grover Cleveland of New York,  and Governor Thomas A. Hendricks of Indiana, with 53.49% of the vote, against former Secretary of State and Senator James G. Blaine of Maine and his running mate Senator John A. Logan of Illinois, with 46.02% of the vote.

Results

See also
 United States presidential elections in Missouri

References

Missouri
1884
1884 Missouri elections